Alexander Moaid Goria Aoraha (born 17 January 2003), is a professional footballer who plays as a midfielder for English club Queens Park Rangers. Born in England, he represents Iraq internationally.

Club career

Queens Park Rangers
Having spent his whole youth career at London club Queens Park Rangers, Aoraha trained with the first team for the first time in November 2022.

International career

Iraq U-23
Eligible to represent England or Iraq, through his father, internationally, Alex chose to represent Iraq.
 
Aoraha received his first call-up for the U-23s in January 2022 for a training camp in Antalya, Turkey in preparation for the 2022 AFC U-23 Asian Cup, during which he played every match. He has won 6 caps and scored 2 goals for the U-23s.

Iraq
After impressing with the U-23s, Aoraha received a call-up to the senior national team in November 2022, just 10 months after first being called up to the U-23s. He was an unused substitute in a friendly against Mexico and made his debut in the starting lineup against Ecuador on November 12.

References

 

2003 births
Living people
Footballers from Greater London
Iraqi footballers
Iraqi expatriate footballers
Iraq international footballers
English footballers
English people of Iraqi descent
Association football midfielders
Queens Park Rangers F.C. players
Iraqi Assyrian people